Benhamyia is a genus of flies in the family Stratiomyidae.

Species
Benhamyia alpina (Hutton, 1901)
Benhamyia apicalis (Walker, 1849)
Benhamyia hoheria (Miller, 1917)
Benhamyia smaragdina (Lindner, 1958)
Benhamyia straznitzkii (Nowicki, 1875)

References

Stratiomyidae
Brachycera genera
Diptera of Australasia